Silliana or Saliana was one of the five main divisions of the kingdom of Rama in prehistoric Awadh. Silliana consisted of the lower range of hills to the north of Uttara Kosala, now belonging to Nepal, with the Tarai at its base.

References

See also
 Pachhimrath
 Purabrath
 Arbar

Awadh
Regions of Uttar Pradesh
History of Uttar Pradesh